The Diocese of Brooklyn is a Latin Church ecclesiastical territory or diocese of the Catholic Church in the U.S. state of New York. It is headquartered in Brooklyn and its territory encompasses the New York City boroughs of Brooklyn and Queens. The Diocese of Brooklyn is a suffragan diocese in the ecclesiastical province of the metropolitan Archdiocese of New York. The diocesan cathedral is the Cathedral Basilica of St. James in Downtown Brooklyn and its co-cathedral is the Co-Cathedral of St. Joseph in Prospect Heights. The current Bishop of Brooklyn is Robert J. Brennan.

Brooklyn is one of the few dioceses in the United States that is made up of 100% urban territory.

The Bishop of the Diocese of Brooklyn, presides from both the Cathedral Basilica of St. James and the Co-Cathedral of St. Joseph. This atypical arrangement was required due to the small size of the Cathedral Basilica of St. James. St. Joseph's Church was designated as a Co-Cathedral for the Diocese of Brooklyn on February 14, 2013, by Pope Benedict XVI after Bishop Nicholas DiMarzio petitioned the Vatican.

History
The diocese was established in 1853 out of the territory of the Roman Catholic Archdiocese of New York, at a time when Brooklyn was still a separate city from New York City. It originally included all of Long Island, but its present-day territory was established in 1957 when Nassau and Suffolk counties were split off to form the Diocese of Rockville Centre.

The opening of the Brooklyn Navy Yard in 1801 drew a number of immigrants, largely Catholics from Northern Ireland, especially from Derry and Donegal. They would cross the East River to attend services at St. Peter's Church on Barclay Street. Periodically, Rev. John Power or others would come to celebrate Mass at the home of William Purcell or at Dempsey's Blooming Grove Garden on Fulton St. The Church of St. James was erected in 1822. In July, 1841, Father Johann Stephen Raffeiner, from the Tyrol, began the German parish of the Most Holy Trinity on a part of the farm of the old Dutch Meserole family in the Bushwick section. Holy Cross Cemetery was opened in 1849. In 1853, Archbishop John Hughes appointed his vicar-general, Irish-born John Loughlin, former pastor of St. Patrick's on Mulberry St. as bishop of the new diocese. Loughlin chose St. James as his cathedral.

During his episcopate, Loughlin founded 120 parishes. Plans to build the larger Cathedral of the Immaculate Conception were deferred in favor of orphanages, schools, and hospitals. He was succeeded in 1892, by Bishop Charles Edward McDonnell, former chancellor of the Roman Catholic Archdiocese of New York. The Roman Catholic Diocese of Brooklyn served at that time 250,000 Catholics. With the increase in the number of immigrants of various nationalities, McDonnell founded a number of national churches which ministered to parishioners in their own language. To this end, he invited several religious institutes into the diocese, including the Redemptorists, Benedictines, Franciscans (including the Minor Conventuals and Capuchins), Jesuits, Sisters of the Holy Family of Nazareth, Missionary Sisters of the Sacred Heart, Daughters of Wisdom, and Sisters of the Holy Infant Jesus. He also built three hospitals. Camp Wycoff and Camp Black, set up during the Spanish–American War were attended by local clergy.

Thomas Edmund Molloy was named the third Bishop of Brooklyn on November 21, 1921. In 1930 Bishop Molloy established the Seminary of the Immaculate Conception. The Roman Catholic Diocese of Rockville Centre was split off from Brooklyn April 6, 1957. Ten days later, Bryan Joseph McEntegart became the next Bishop of Brooklyn. He built six high schools, Cathedral Preparatory Seminary, and a hospital. He improved outreach to the growing Hispanic population, he sent priests and religious to study Spanish language and culture. Bishop Francis Mugavero experience as former head Brooklyn's Catholic Charities was reflected in his episcopate. In 1971, Mugavero established the Catholic Migration Office to serve the needs of immigrants and refugees living in Brooklyn and Queens. The Nehemiah project produced affordable housing in Brownsville.

In September 2018, the Roman Catholic Diocese of Brooklyn agreed to a record $27.5 million settlement for sex abuse allegations. On February 15, 2019, the Roman Catholic Diocese of Brooklyn and Queens made public a list of 108 clergy who were "credibly accused" of committing sexual abuse, some of whom have also been convicted for their crimes. Along with the list, Bishop Nicholas DiMarzio also issued a letter of apology, asking for forgiveness. In June 2020, the FBI arrested Rev. Francis Hughes, a priest serving in Queens, on child pornography charges and sex-related charges involving underage minors. In a separate case, the Vatican exonerated Bishop DiMarzio of  allegations of sexual abuse dating back a half century. After an inquiry led by former FBI Director Louis Freeh, the Congregation for the Doctrine of the Faith said that the accusations were groundless.

Churches

Bishops

The lists of the bishops and auxiliary bishops of the diocese and their years of service, followed by other priests of the diocese who became bishops:

Bishops of the Diocese of Brooklyn

John Loughlin (1853–1891)
Charles Edward McDonnell (1892–1921)
Thomas Edmund Molloy (1922–1956), elevated to Archbishop ad personam in 1951
Bryan Joseph McEntegart (1957–1968), elevated to Archbishop ad personam in 1966
Francis Mugavero (1968–1990)
Thomas Vose Daily (1990–2003)
Nicholas Anthony DiMarzio (2003–2021) 
Robert J. Brennan (2021–present)

Current auxiliary bishops 
James Massa (2015–present)
Witold Mroziewski (2015–present)
Neil Edward Tiedemann (2016–present)

Former auxiliary bishops
George Mundelein (1909–1915), appointed Archbishop of Chicago (Cardinal in 1924)
Thomas Edmund Molloy (1920-1921), appointed Bishop of this diocese
Raymond Augustine Kearney (1934–1956)
John Joseph Boardman (1952–1977)
Edmund Joseph Reilly (1955–1958)
Joseph Peter Michael Denning (1959–1982)
Charles Richard Mulrooney (1959–1981)
John J. Snyder (1972–1979), appointed Bishop of Saint Augustine
Joseph Michael Sullivan (1980–2005)
René Arnold Valero (1980–2005)
Anthony Bevilacqua (1980–1983), appointed Bishop of Pittsburgh and later Archbishop of Philadelphia (elevated to Cardinal in 1991)
Ignatius Anthony Catanello (1994–2010)
Gerald Barbarito (1994–1999), appointed Bishop of Palm Beach
Guy Sansaricq (2006–2010)
Frank Joseph Caggiano (2006-2013), appointed Bishop of Bridgeport
Octavio Cisneros (2006–2020), retired on October 30, 2020.
Raymond Francis Chappetto (2012–2022), retired on March 7, 2022.
Paul Robert Sanchez (2012–2022), retired on March 30, 2022.

Other priests of the diocese who became bishops
 George J. Caruana, appointed Bishop of Puerto Rico in 1921 and later Apostolic Nuncio and Apostolic Delegate and Titular Archbishop
 James Henry Ambrose Griffiths, appointed  Auxiliary Bishop of Military, USA in 1949 and later Auxiliary Bishop of New York
 John Joseph Carberry, appointed Coadjutor Bishop (in 1956) and later Bishop of Lafayette in Indiana, Bishop of Columbus, and Archbishop of Saint Louis (elevated to Cardinal in 1969)
 Vincent John Baldwin (priest here, 1931-1957), appointed Auxiliary Bishop of Rockville Centre in 1962
 John R. McGann (priest here, 1950-1957), appointed Auxiliary Bishop of Rockville Centre in 1970 and later Bishop of Rockville Centre
 James Joseph Daly (priest here, 1948-1957), appointed Auxiliary Bishop of Rockville Centre in 1977
 Gerald Augustine John Ryan (priest here, 1950-1957), appointed Auxiliary Bishop of Rockville Centre in 1977
 Alfred John Markiewicz (priest here, 1953-1957), appointed Auxiliary Bishop of Rockville Centre in 1986 and later Bishop of Kalamazoo
 Emil Aloysius Wcela (priest here, 1956-1957), appointed Auxiliary Bishop of Rockville Centre in 1989
 Vincent DePaul Breen, appointed Bishop of Metuchen in 1997
 Edward Bernard Scharfenberger, appointed Bishop of Albany in 2014
Kevin J. Sweeney, appointed Bishop of Paterson in 2020

Priests "equivalent to diocesan bishops" affiliated with this diocese
Father Leo Joseph White, Apostolic Prefect of Garissa, Kenya, 1976-1984 - incardinated in 1990.

Education

The sitting bishop is also the true principal of the diocese's pre-seminary high school, Cathedral Preparatory Seminary. As of March 2009, Cathedral Preparatory Seminary is the only full-time high school seminary in the nation. Three Diocesan and/or parish high schools are under the auspices of the Roman Catholic Diocese of Brooklyn and Queens. As of 2019, only 36 Diocese of Brooklyn schools were still not scheduled to close, compared to the 102 which were operational in the 1980s. Between the mid-2000s and 2019, the Roman Catholic Diocese of Brooklyn permanently closed 45 of its schools.

High schools

There are three diocesan and/or parish high schools under the auspices of the Roman Catholic Diocese of Brooklyn. While the Catholic high schools below may geographically lie within the diocese, most are run independently of it. 

Brooklyn
 Bishop Loughlin Memorial High School- operated and staffed by the De la Salle Christian Brothers
 Cristo Rey Brooklyn High School- operated and staffed by the Sisters of Mercy
 Fontbonne Hall Academy- affiliated with the Sisters of St. Joseph
 Nazareth Regional High School- sponsored by the Xaverian Brothers
 St. Edmund Preparatory High School- staffed by a member of the Oratory of St. Philip of Neri and lay faculty, formerly staffed by the Dominican Sisters of Sparkill, and the Sisters of St. Joseph
 Saint Saviour High School of Brooklyn- formerly staffed by the School Sisters of Notre Dame
 Xaverian High School- operated and staffed by the Xaverian Brothers

Queens

 Archbishop Molloy High School- staffed by the Marist Brothers
 Cathedral Preparatory Seminary- staffed by Diocesan Priests 
Christ the King Regional High School- formerly staffed by the Marist Brothers and Daughters of Wisdom
 Holy Cross High School- operated and staffed by Brothers of the Congregation of the Holy Cross
 Monsignor McClancy Memorial High School- operated and staffed by Brothers of the Sacred Heart
 St. Francis Preparatory School- staffed by the Franciscan Brothers of Brooklyn
 St. John's Preparatory School- staffed by Diocesan Priests, formerly staffed by the De la Salle Christian Brothers and Sisters of Mercy
 The Mary Louis Academy- operated and staffed by the Sisters of St. Joseph of Brentwood

Elementary schools

There were 116 diocesan and parish elementary schools in the Roman Catholic Diocese of Brooklyn. In March 2009.  In the fall of 2009, a new free tuition school called the Pope John Paul II Family Academy  opened  at St. Barbara's School in Bushwick, Brooklyn..png In 2019 two diocesan elementary schools– Our Lady of Guadalupe Catholic Academy in Bensonhurst, and Mary Queen of Heaven Catholic Academy in Mill Basin - permanently closed, and two Bushwick schools, St Brigid and St. Frances Cabrini, merged.

Brooklyn

 Bay Ridge Catholic Academy
 Blessed Sacrament Catholic Academy - Brooklyn
 Brooklyn Jesuit Prep
 Good Shepherd Catholic Academy (Marine Park )- formerly staffed by Dominican Sisters
 Midwood Catholic Academy
 Our Lady of Grace Catholic Academy - Brooklyn
 Our Lady of Perpetual Help Catholic Academy of Brooklyn
 Our Lady of Trust Catholic Academy
 Saint Saviour Catholic Academy
 Salve Regina Catholic Academy
 St Catherine of Genoa ~ St Therese of Lisieux Catholic Academy
 St. Athanasius Catholic Academy
 St. Bernadette Catholic Academy
 St. Bernard Catholic Academy
 St. Brigid-St. Frances Cabrini Catholic Academy
 St. Edmund Elementary School
 St. Ephrem Catholic Academy
 St. Francis of Assisi Catholic Academy - Brooklyn
 St. Joseph the Worker Catholic Academy
 St. Mark Catholic Academy
 St. Patrick Catholic Academy (Bay Ridge)
 St. Peter Catholic Academy
 St. Stanislaus Kostka Catholic Academy
 Visitation Academy (Bay Ridge)- operated and staffed by Sisters of the Visitation

Queens

 Divine Mercy Catholic Academy (Ozone Park)- formerly staffed by Ursuline Sisters (including sister of Joe Torre), currently staffed by Lay Faculty and Sisters of the Holy Family of Nazareth
 Divine Wisdom Catholic Academy
 Holy Child Jesus Catholic Academy
 Holy Family Catholic Academy, Fresh Meadows
 Immaculate Conception Catholic Academy - Astoria
 Immaculate Conception Catholic Academy - Jamaica
 Incarnation Catholic Academy
 Notre Dame Catholic Academy
 Our Lady of Fatima
 Our Lady of Hope
 Our Lady of Mercy Catholic Academy
 Our Lady of Perpetual Help Catholic Academy -S.O.P
 Our Lady of Sorrows Catholic Academy
 Our Lady of the Blessed Sacrament
 Our Lady of the Snows Catholic Academy
 Our Lady Queen of Martyrs Catholic Academy
 Resurrection-Ascension Catholic Academy
 Sacred Heart Catholic Academy - Bayside
 Sacred Heart Catholic Academy - Cambria Heights
 Sacred Heart Catholic Academy - Glendale
 St. Adalbert Catholic Academy
 St. Francis de Sales Catholic Academy
 St. Thomas the Apostle Catholic Academy
 Ss. Joachim and Anne
 St. Andrew Avellino Catholic Academy
 St. Bartholomew Catholic Academy
 St. Clare Catholic Academy
 St. Elizabeth Catholic Academy
 St. Francis of Assisi Catholic Academy - Astoria
 St. Gregory the Great Catholic Academy - Bellerose
 St. Helen Catholic Academy
 St. Joan of Arc Catholic School
 St. Joseph Catholic Academy
 St. Kevin Catholic Academy
 St. Leo Catholic Academy
 St. Luke Catholic School
 St. Margaret Catholic Academy
 St. Matthias Catholic Academy
 St. Mel Catholic Academy
 St. Michael's Catholic Academy
 St. Nicholas of Tolentine Catholic Academy
 St. Rose of Lima Catholic Academy
 St. Sebastian Catholic Academy
 St. Stanislaus Kostka Catholic Academy of Queens

Seminary
The major seminary for the Diocese of Brooklyn from 1926 to 2012 was the Seminary of the Immaculate Conception in Huntington, NY. In 2012, the site in Huntington ended its seminary program and seminarians from both the Rockville Centre Diocese and the Brooklyn Diocese, now study at St. Joseph's Seminary in Yonkers, NY for their major seminary programs.

Queens
 Cathedral Seminary House of Formation (Douglaston)- established 1967. Currently serves as the college/minor seminary for the Archdiocese of New York, the Diocese of Brooklyn and the Diocese of Rockville Centre. Also serves as the minor seminary for students from other dioceses. Seminarians enrolled at the Cathedral Seminary House of Formation study for their undergraduate philosophy degrees at either St. John's University or Fordham University.

Cemeteries
There are nine Catholic cemeteries serving the diocese; two in Brooklyn, five in Queens and three outside the diocese.

Brooklyn
 Holy Cross Cemetery
 Most Holy Trinity Cemetery

Queens
 Saint John Cemetery
 Mount St. Mary Cemetery
 St. Monica Cemetery
 Our Lady of Mount Carmel Cemetery

Outside of the Diocese of Brooklyn
 St. Charles / Resurrection Cemeteries
 Trinity Cemetery
 St. Mary Star of the Sea Cemetery

Hospitals
Saint Vincent's Catholic Medical Center

References

External links

 Official Site

 
Culture of Brooklyn
Religious organizations established in 1853
Brooklyn
Brooklyn
1853 establishments in New York (state)